Racivir is an experimental nucleoside reverse transcriptase inhibitor (NRTI), developed by Pharmasset for the treatment of HIV. It is the enantiomer of emtricitabine, a widely used NRTI, meaning that the two compounds are mirror images of each other.

References

Nucleoside analog reverse transcriptase inhibitors
Pyrimidones
Oxathiolanes
Organofluorides
Experimental drugs
Hydroxymethyl compounds